Porter Township is one of twelve townships in Porter County, Indiana. As of the 2010 census, its population was 9,367.

History
Porter Township was originally called Fish Lake Township, and under the latter name was organized in 1838. The name was changed to Porter Township in 1841.

Cities and towns
The township has no incorporated communities. Boone Grove, located on the southern boundary of the township continues to be an important community.

Education
The township is served by the Porter Township School Corporation. Boone Grove High School is located northwest of Boone Grove.

Cemeteries

References

External links 
 Indiana Township Association
 United Township Association of Indiana

Townships in Porter County, Indiana
Townships in Indiana